The 1955–56 season was Cardiff City F.C.'s 29th season in the Football League. They competed in the 22-team Division One, then the first tier of English football, finishing seventeenth.

Season review

League standings

Results by round

FA Cup
After beating Leeds United in their first game, Cardiff were eliminated by West Ham United in the fourth round.

Welsh Cup
Cardiff were drawn against Pembroke Borough in the fifth round for the second time in a row and, after a 2–2 draw, advanced to the sixth round with a 9–0 replay win. Wins over Wrexham and Oswestry Town saw the club reach the final, beating South Wales rivals Swansea Town 3–2, with a brace from Brian Walsh and one goal from John McSeveney winning the trophy for the eighth time in the club's history and their first since 1930.

Players

Fixtures and results

First Division

FA Cup

Welsh Cup

See also
List of Cardiff City F.C. seasons

References

Cardiff City F.C. seasons
Cardiff City
Card